Lee Sung-wook (born October 3, 1979) is a South Korean actor. He is known for his roles in dramas such as Duel (2017), Misty (2018), 365: Repeat the Year (2020), and Forecasting Love and Weather (2022)''.

Selected filmography

Television series

Film

Awards and nominations

References

External links 
 

1979 births
Living people
21st-century South Korean male actors
South Korean male television actors
South Korean male film actors
South Korean male musical theatre actors
South Korean male stage actors
Male actors from Seoul